Jehad Abdussalam Muntasser (born 26 July 1978) is a Libyan former football midfielder.

Muntasser started his career at Italian club Pro Sesto, before being signed by English Premier League club Arsenal in 1997. He made one brief appearance for Arsenal's first team, coming on in a match against Birmingham City on 14 October 1997. He was sold to Bristol City in January 1998 but was released by them on a free transfer in the summer of 1999 without playing a first-team game.

He returned to Italy and has since played for a string of Serie C and Serie B clubs—Viterbese (1999–2000), Catania (2000–2001), L'Aquila (2001–2002), Triestina (2002–2004), Perugia (2004–2005)—before joining newly promoted Serie A side Treviso in 2005. Treviso however were relegated on their first season back at the top, and started the 2006–07 season back in Serie B. He later signed for a Qatar club, Al-Wakra Sports Club, in January 2008 Jehad signed for 6 months for Al Ittihad of Libya. He was a member of the Libyan 2006 African Nations Cup team.

During the Libyan revolution of 2011 Jehad dedicated his time and resources to helping children affected by the conflict by putting together a charity fundraising football event named Friends of Libya's Children. The event brought together internationally renowned football stars such as Javier  Zanetti, Fabio Cannavaro, Marco Materazzi, Pavel Nedved and many more that competed in a game hosted in Dubai and attended by Mustafa Abdul Jalil (at the time Libya's interim leader). The event was broadcast around the Arab region.

He is the grandson of Libyan prime minister Mahmud al-Muntasir.

He created The Victorious, a football talent show that aims at discovering the hidden talents in football among the Arab youths. The Victorious show has aired for two seasons on Dubai Channels Network, and preparations for the third season are ongoing.

References

External links
 
 
  Player profile with Photo - Sporting-heroes.net
 Player profile - MTN Africa Cup of Nations 2006

1978 births
2006 Africa Cup of Nations players
A.C. Perugia Calcio players
Treviso F.B.C. 1993 players
Al-Wakrah SC players
Arsenal F.C. players
Association football midfielders
Bristol City F.C. players
Catania S.S.D. players
Empoli F.C. players
Expatriate footballers in England
Expatriate footballers in Italy
Expatriate footballers in Qatar
Libyan expatriates in the United Kingdom
Libyan expatriate sportspeople in Italy
Libyan expatriate sportspeople in Qatar
L'Aquila Calcio 1927 players
Libya international footballers
Libyan expatriate footballers
Libyan footballers
Living people
Qatar Stars League players
S.S.D. Pro Sesto players
Serie A players
Serie B players
U.S. Triestina Calcio 1918 players